Anna Malin Elisabet Källström (born 14 May 1969) is a Swedish Olympic sailor. She finished 12th in the Elliott 6m event at the 2012 Summer Olympics together with Anna Kjellberg and Lotta Harrysson.

References

Swedish female sailors (sport)
Olympic sailors of Sweden
Elliott 6m class sailors
Royal Gothenburg Yacht Club sailors
Sailors at the 2012 Summer Olympics – Elliott 6m
1969 births
Living people